Neil Best (born 3 April 1979 in Belfast, Northern Ireland) is a former rugby union footballer, who attended Wellington College Belfast and played his school rugby there until he left in 1997 after upper sixth. The last professional team he played for was London Scottish and previously played on the Irish national team. He played as a flanker.

Best was a relative late comer to rugby, starting his career with Malone RFC. He has a BSc in chemical engineering and Msc in polymer engineering. He scored 7 tries for Ulster in 2006 – three in the Heineken Cup and four in the Celtic League.

The Times newspaper reported that at the start of 2005 that he was arrested and later cautioned for a drunken assault on a club mate, which almost ended his career, however later in the year he made his Senior international début for Ireland as a replacement v New Zealand in November 2005. Also in November 2005, he scored his 1st Test try for v Romania. 

His form for Ulster and during the summer tour to Australia and New Zealand saw Best included in the Ireland squad for the 2006 Autumn Internationals. He was named man of the match in Ireland's 21–6 victory against Australia at Lansdowne Road.

It was announced in February 2008 that Best would join English side Northampton Saints at the end of the 2007/2008 season.

At the end of 2008, Best was banned from playing rugby for 18 weeks for reckless contact with James Haskell
Best played in the Ireland A squad in the 2008 Churchill Cup, and also played an integral part in the Ireland A team that won the 2009 Churchill Cup.

In 2010, Neil joined Worcester Warriors, before retiring in 2015. In 2010 he also had to spend time on a drink driver's rehabilitation course after having been found to be almost twice the legal limit when breathalysed by police after he crashed his Audi A3 on the A512 at Thringstone, in Leicestershire. Best was banned from driving for 17 months and fined £1250. He now coaches Singapore Irish.

References

External links
Northampton Saints profile
Ulster profile
Ireland profile

1979 births
Irish rugby union players
Ireland international rugby union players
Ulster Rugby players
Belfast Harlequins rugby union players
Malone RFC players
Northampton Saints players
Living people
Rugby union flankers
Rugby union players from Belfast
Ireland Wolfhounds international rugby union players
People educated at Wellington College Belfast